Lodew Bosscke (1900 – 1980) was a Belgian painter. His work was part of the painting event in the art competition at the 1936 Summer Olympics.

References

1900 births
1980 deaths
20th-century Belgian painters
Belgian painters
Olympic competitors in art competitions
People from Schaerbeek